KBTW (104.5 FM) is a radio station broadcasting Spanish language format to the Barstow, California, area.  The station is owned by Radio Lazer and licensed to Lazer Licenses, LLC.

External links
 official site

BTW
BTW
Barstow, California
Mass media in San Bernardino County, California